Siljan, in Dalarna in central Sweden, is Sweden's seventh largest lake. The largest town on its shore is Mora.

Impact crater 

The lake is located around the southwestern perimeter of the Siljan Ring (Swedish: Siljansringen), a circular geological formation which was formed 377 million years ago in the Devonian by a major meteorite impact. The original crater, now mostly eroded, is estimated to have been about 52 km (32 mi) in diameter and is the largest known impact crater in Europe (excluding Russia). The Cambrian, Ordovician and Silurian sedimentary rocks deformed by the impact are rich in fossils.

Some people suspect that there might be oil in the area, but drilling has been unsuccessful so far. There are large deposits of lead and zinc in the Boda area.

Deep drilling project 
The government-owned power company Vattenfall drilled a deep well in search of natural gas.   The project began as a deep commercial wildcat well, and its unusual location in fractured granite attracted scientific attention (e.g., as potentially significant in the context of theory of abiogenic petroleum origin).

The Gravberg-1 well location, in the north-northeast section of the ring, was chosen because a gravity anomaly indicates less dense rock below, and four seismic reflectors may represent cap rock above a natural gas reservoir.  Electrical resistance is lower in the ring than outside it, suggesting the rocks contain fluid. Soil in the area showed clear traces of methane and heavy hydrocarbons, with a halo around the ring coincident with vanadium and nickel trace elements; the sediment was shown to not be the source of the hydrocarbons due to their location, ice movement pattern, and low level of maturity. Although the greatest gas leakage was in the north-northwestern corner, the lack of leakage in the central area suggested an underlying cap.

Drilling began on 1 July 1986. By September 1989 it reached  in depth.

The first three were penetrated and found to be dolerite sills, but the fourth had been identified before drilling as having the best potential for gas production. The dolerite is believed to have existed as much as 1/2 billion years before the meteorite impact.

Traces of methane were found at all depths, with higher levels in dolerite.  Although they appear to be of abiogenic origin, only that near the dolerite sills points to a probable mantle origin. Hydrogen was found in most sections of the hole, correlated with helium.  The helium isotopic pattern was consistent with a radiogenic, crustal origin.

The substance was black, sticky when wet, powdery when dry, showed no fluorescence, and was strongly magnetic. None of the drilling materials showed gas chromatographic patterns which corresponded with the black substance. It contained no ordinary rock minerals, none of the granite fines expected in the drilling fluid, but is made up of microscopic magnetite held together by oils.

The well did not penetrate the fourth seismic reflector, did not produce large quantities of fuel, and never entered commercial production. Only  of oil were produced; it was later shown to originate from organic additives, lubricants and mud used in the drilling process.

A second hole, Stenberg-1, was drilled in the center of the ring,  distant from the ring sediments and from Gravberg-1. The hole produced gases and oily magnetite sludge similar to those found in Gravberg-1.

Localities in the Siljan Ring
 Leksand
 Mora
 Orsa
 Rättvik
 Boda

References

External links

Dalälven basin
Impact crater lakes
Lakes of Dalarna County